is a passenger railway station in the city of Asahi, Chiba Japan, operated by the East Japan Railway Company (JR East).

Lines

Station layout
The station consists of a single side platform serving bi-directional traffic. The station is unattended.

History
Kurahashi Station was opened on 1 June 1960 for passenger operations only. The station was absorbed into the JR East network upon the privatization of the Japan National Railways (JNR) on 1 April 1987. A new station building was completed in December 2008.

Passenger statistics
In fiscal 2006, the station was used by an average of 61 passengers daily (boarding passengers only).

Surrounding area
 Tsurumaki Elementary School

See also
 List of railway stations in Japan

References

External links

 JR East station information 

Railway stations in Japan opened in 1960
Railway stations in Chiba Prefecture
Sōbu Main Line
Asahi, Chiba